Wicked in Rock is an EP by actress and singer Kerry Ellis. It was arranged, produced and accompanied on guitar by Brian May and features Taylor Hawkins on drums. A 60+ piece orchestra, conducted by Steve Sidwell, was also used. The album had a physical release on 7 July 2008 as a CD and as a 12" vinyl. The EP was also released for digital download. The three tracks on this EP are included on her debut studio album Anthems (2010).

Track listing

Credits and personnel 
Kerry Ellis - lead vocals, backing vocals
Brian May - arrangement, bass, guitars, keys, production, programming
Steve Sidwell - orchestral arranger, conductor
Taylor Hawkins - drums (for "Defying Gravity" and "I'm Not that Girl")
Chris Chaney - bass (for "I'm Not that Girl")
Roger Taylor - drums (sticks) (for "No-One but You")
Keith Prior - drums (brushes)  (for "No-One but You")
Justin Shirley-Smith - co-producer, engineer
Kris Fredriksson - co-producer, engineer
Kevin Metcalf - master
Isobel Grrifiths - orchestra contractor
The London Philharmonic Orchestra - orchestra
Perry Montague-Mason - orchestra leader (for "Defying Gravity" and "I'm Not that Girl")
Gavyn Wright - leader (for "No-One but You")
Steve Price - orchestra recording engineer
Matt Bartram - orchestra Pro Tools (for "Defying Gravity" and "I'm Not that Girl")
Tom Jenkins - orchestra Pro Tools (for "No-One but You")
Jake Jackson - assistant (for "No-One but You")
Joshua J. Macrae - additional Pro Tools (for "No-One but You")

Source:

Release history

References

External links 

2008 EPs
Kerry Ellis albums